Donnie Wayne Johnson (born December 15, 1949) is an American actor, producer and singer. He played the role of James "Sonny" Crockett in the 1980s television series Miami Vice, for which he won a Golden Globe, and received a Primetime Emmy Award nomination for his work in the role. He also played the titular character in the 1990s series Nash Bridges. Johnson received a star on the Hollywood Walk of Fame in 1996.

Johnson has appeared in films such as A Boy and His Dog (1975), Tin Cup (1996), Machete (2010), Django Unchained (2012) and Knives Out (2019). As a singer, he released the albums Heartbeat (1986) and Let It Roll (1989). His cover version of "Heartbeat" peaked at No. 5 on the Billboard Hot 100.

Early life 
Johnson was born on December 15, 1949, in Flat Creek, Missouri. His mother, Nell (née Wilson; 1933–1975), was a beautician. His father, Fredie Wayne Johnson (1930–2017), was a farmer. At the time of his birth, Johnson's mother and father were 16 and 19 years old, respectively. Johnson was raised in poverty in Wichita, Kansas, where his parents relocated when he was six years old.

He graduated from Wichita South High School, where he was involved in the high school's theater program. As a senior, he played the lead role of Tony in West Side Story. His biography noted that he had previously appeared in Burnt Cork & Melody and The Hullabaloo. After graduating from high school in 1967, he enrolled at the University of Kansas as a theater major, but dropped out after one year. He subsequently relocated to San Francisco, California, to attend the American Conservatory Theater.

Acting career

Early years 
Johnson's first major role was in the 1969 Los Angeles stage production of Fortune and Men's Eyes, in which he played the lead role of Smitty. The play included a "shockingly realistic prison rape" scene portrayed by Johnson. This exposure led to the quickly forgotten film The Magic Garden of Stanley Sweetheart (1970). Johnson continued to work on stage, film and television without breaking into stardom. His notable films from this period were Zachariah (1971), The Harrad Experiment (1973) (a film in which Johnson displayed frontal nudity), Lollipop and Roses (1974) and A Boy and His Dog (1975). In 1976, Johnson was the roommate of actor Sal Mineo at the time Mineo was murdered.

Miami Vice 
In 1984, after years of struggling to establish himself as a TV actor, Johnson landed a starring role as undercover police detective Sonny Crockett in the Michael Mann/Universal Television cop series, Miami Vice. The show ran from 1984 to 1990. Miami Vice made Johnson "a major international star". According to Rolling Stone, "No one had more swagger in the Reagan era than Don Johnson. As Miami Vice's Sonny Crockett, the undercover detective and professional stubble-cultivator who lived on a houseboat with his pet alligator Elvis, he embodied masculine cool in the era of coke binges and Lamborghinis". The Sonny Crockett character typically wore thousand-dollar Versace and Hugo Boss suits over pastel cotton T-shirts, drove a Ferrari, wore expensive timepieces by Rolex and Ebel, and lived on an Endeavour yacht. Miami Vice was noted for its revolutionary use of music, cinematography and imagery; and for its glitzy take on the police drama genre. In the show, Crockett's partner was Ricardo Tubbs, played by Philip Michael Thomas.

Johnson's work on Miami Vice earned him a Golden Globe Award, for Best Performance by an Actor In A Television Series - Drama, in 1986. Johnson was nominated for the same award in 1987. He was also nominated for an Emmy Award for Outstanding Lead Actor in a Drama Series in 1985.

Between seasons on Miami Vice, Johnson gained further renown through TV miniseries such as the 1985 remake of The Long, Hot Summer. During the time he was on Miami Vice, he had set up an hour-long music video/pay cable program in the works, with videocassette versions of the programs Johnson had hosted being handled by distributor CBS/Fox Video, and the upcoming product will be a tie-in to his first album Heartbeat, which would be available for CBS/Epic Records.

Nash Bridges 
Johnson later starred in the 1996–2001 CBS-TV police drama Nash Bridges with Cheech Marin, Jeff Perry, Jaime P. Gomez, Kelly Hu, Wendy Moniz, Annette O'Toole, Jodi Lyn O'Keefe as his daughter Cassidy, and James Gammon as his father Nick. Johnson portrayed the title role, an inspector (later promoted to captain) for the San Francisco Police Department. In Nash Bridges, Johnson was again paired with a flashy convertible car, a yellow 1971 Plymouth Barracuda.

2001–2010 

In the fall of 2005, Johnson briefly starred in The WB courtroom television drama show Just Legal as a jaded lawyer with a young and idealistic protégé/partner (Jay Baruchel); the show was canceled in October 2005 after just three of the eight produced episodes aired. In January 2007, Johnson began a run in the West End of London production of Guys and Dolls as Nathan Detroit.

Johnson also had a role in the Norwegian comedy Lange Flate Ballær 2 ("Long Flat Balls II"), directed by Johnson's friend Harald Zwart. Johnson did the movie as a favor to Zwart. The movie was launched on March 14, 2008, in Norway, with Johnson making an appearance at the premiere. He next appeared in When in Rome with Danny DeVito, Anjelica Huston and Kristen Bell.

Johnson had a supporting role in Robert Rodriguez's film Machete. Johnson played Von Jackson, "a twisted border vigilante leading a small army". The film was released on September 3, 2010. In October 2010, he began appearing on the HBO series Eastbound & Down, playing Kenny Powers' long-lost father, going by the alias "Eduardo Sanchez". He also reprised his role as Sonny Crockett for a Nike commercial with LeBron James in which the NBA player contemplates acting and appears alongside Johnson on Miami Vice.

2011–present 
In September 2011, Johnson had a cameo in the comedy A Good Old Fashioned Orgy with Jason Sudeikis. Johnson had a supporting role in the 2012 Quentin Tarantino film Django Unchained, playing a southern plantation owner named Spencer 'Big Daddy' Bennett. In 2014, Johnson starred as the character "Jim Bob" opposite Sam Shepard and Michael C. Hall in Jim Mickle's critically acclaimed crime film, Cold in July. In 2015, Johnson began starring in the ABC prime time soap opera Blood & Oil.

In 2018, he starred as the character of Arthur, the love interest of Vivian, played by Jane Fonda in Bill Holderman's romantic-comedy Book Club. In 2019, Johnson played the role of Richard Drysdale in Rian Johnson's murder-mystery Knives Out; and starred as Police Chief Judd Crawford in the HBO series Watchmen.

In 2021, Johnson co-starred on Kenan, until its cancellation in May 2022. He also appeared in a Nash Bridges television film, with co-star Cheech Marin, on the USA Network in 2021.

Music career 
Johnson released two albums of pop music in the 1980s. Heartbeat was released in 1986. Let it Roll was released in 1989. His single "Heartbeat" reached No. 5 on the Billboard Hot 100 singles chart.

"Till I Loved You", a duet with then-girlfriend Barbra Streisand, was a top 40 hit on the Billboard Hot 100. It was released on the Columbia Records studio album Till I Loved You on October 25, 1988. The song was re-released on the Streisand album Duets in 2002.

Powerboat racing 
In 1986, Johnson achieved his first motor sport victory. He won a 1,100-mile powerboat race up the Mississippi River from New Orleans to St. Louis. Characterized by shipmates as an aggressive, fearless pilot who did not make mistakes, Johnson was named the American Power Boat Association's 1988 World Champion of the Offshore World Cup.

Personal life

Relationships and family 

Johnson has been married five times to four women. Three of his marriages were brief; the first two were annulled within a matter of days. The names of Johnson's first two wives have not been made public, though they are said to have been a dancer and a "rich bimbo".

Circa 1971, Johnson lived with self-described "groupie", Pamela Des Barres.

During the first half of 1972, Johnson met Melanie Griffith, the 14-year-old daughter of his Harrad Experiment co-star Tippi Hedren. When Griffith was 15, she and Johnson began living together in a rented house in Laurel Canyon. On her 18th birthday they became engaged, and were married in January 1976; they separated that July and divorced in November.

In 1980, Johnson dated Sally Adams, mother of actress Nicollette Sheridan.

In January of the following year, he met former Warhol model Patti D'Arbanville at a Los Angeles restaurant. The pair lived together from 1981 to 1985, but never married. Johnson and D'Arbanville have a son, Jesse Wayne Johnson (born December 7, 1982).

Cybill Shepherd has written of a liaison with Johnson during the making of the television miniseries The Long Hot Summer (1985).

Johnson next had a relationship with Barbra Streisand, lasting into at least September 1988.

Just days after breaking up with Streisand, Johnson, then 38, was linked to 18-year-old Uma Thurman.

Johnson and Griffith reunited close to the start of 1989, and gave birth to a daughter, Dakota Johnson (born October 4, 1989) and were married again from that year until 1996.

Before reuniting with Griffith, Johnson was briefly involved with Dead Bang co-star Penelope Ann Miller.

In 1996–1997, Johnson dated Jodi Lyn O'Keefe, who played his daughter on Nash Bridges. Johnson was 47 at the time, while O'Keefe was 18.

On April 29, 1999, Johnson married San Francisco socialite and Montessori nursery school teacher Kelley Phleger, former longtime girlfriend of Governor Gavin Newsom, at the Pacific Heights mansion of Ann and Gordon Getty. Actor Robert Wagner served as best man, and Mayor Willie Brown presided over the civil ceremony. Johnson and Phleger have three children together: a daughter, Atherton Grace (born December 28, 1999), and two sons, Jasper Breckinridge (born June 6, 2002), and Deacon (born April 29, 2006).

Johnson was "best friends" with journalist Hunter S. Thompson, who wrote on Nash Bridges, and his daughter Dakota saw Thompson as a "godfather figure."

Legal issues 
In November 2002, German customs officers at the SwissGerman border performed a routine search of Johnson's car. Bank statements evidencing US$8 billion in transactions were found in the trunk of his car. He was accompanied in his black Mercedes-Benz by three men: an investment adviser, a personal assistant, and a third unknown individual who could not be identified. Initially it was thought Johnson was involved in money laundering, but he was cleared of wrongdoing.

In May 2008, within hours of losing his Woody Creek, Colorado, home to foreclosure, Johnson paid off his $14.5 million debt.

In July 2010, a Los Angeles jury awarded Johnson $23.2 million in a lawsuit against production company Rysher Entertainment, from whom Johnson sought a share of profits commensurate with his ownership of half the copyright of Nash Bridges. Rysher announced it would appeal the verdict. In January 2013, Rysher settled the suit with a $19 million payment.

Filmography

Film

Television

Discography

Studio albums

Compilation albums

Singles

Featured singles

Videography 
1987: Heartbeat -  Full Length Video (VHS) - (Release date: May 10, 1987)

Awards and recognition

References

Further reading 
Hershkovits, David. Don Johnson, in series, 2M Communications Production[s]. New York: St. Martin's Press, 1986. 
Latham, Caroline. Miami Magic: Don Johnson and Philip Michael Thomas, the Inside Story of the Stars of 'Miami Vice' [and of their other television and film work]. New York: Zebra Books, 1985. N.B.: The subtitle given, lacking on the t.p., is from the pbk. book's front cover.

External links 

 

1949 births
Living people
20th-century American male actors
21st-century American male actors
Actors from Wichita, Kansas
American male film actors
American male television actors
American motorboat racers
American television directors
Best Drama Actor Golden Globe (television) winners
Male actors from Kansas
Male actors from Missouri
People from Barry County, Missouri
Griffith family
American Conservatory Theater alumni